Orthopterygium is a monotypic genus of dioecious plants in the subfamily Anacardioideae of the cashew and sumac family Anacardiaceae. It contains the single species Orthopterygium huaucui, which is endemic to western Peru.

References

Anacardiaceae
Endemic flora of Peru
Monotypic Sapindales genera
Anacardiaceae genera
Dioecious plants